Yunfu Mansion is a  skyscraper located in Wuxi, Jiangsu, China. Construction began in 2011 and ended in 2015. It is the 5th tallest building in Wuxi.

The major tenant is Ascott Wuxi Central which operates 134 serviced residence catering to business executives.

See also
List of tallest buildings in China
List of tallest buildings in the world

References

Skyscrapers in Wuxi
Residential skyscrapers in China